HMS Ascension (K502) was a  of the United Kingdom that served in the Royal Navy during World War II. She originally was ordered by the United States Navy as the  USS Hargood (PF-74) and was transferred to the Royal Navy prior to completion.

Construction and acquisition
The ship, originally designated a "patrol gunboat," PG-182, was ordered by the United States Maritime Commission under a United States Navy contract as the first USS Hargood, a British name she carried because of her intended transfer to the United Kingdom. Reclassified as a "patrol frigate," PF-74, on 15 April 1943, she was laid down by the Walsh-Kaiser Company at Providence, Rhode Island, on 30 April 1943. The British renamed her Ascension prior to launching. She was launched on 6 August 1943, sponsored by Mrs. A. A. Kirby.

Service history
Transferred to the United Kingdom under Lend-Lease on 24 November 1943, the ship served in the Royal Navy as HMS Ascension (K502) on patrol and escort duty.

While Natal proceeded to Scapa Flow in the Orkney Islands, Ascensions group depth-charged the position, bringing more flotsam from the submarine to the surface. The destroyer  claimed a share of the kill after depth-charging an oil slick  to the south under the assumption that it was oil from U-714, which Wiverns crew believed had been only been damaged by Natal and was attempting to escape. Although some controversy surrounds credit for the sinking, naval authorities later determined that Natal had sunk U-714 with the loss of the submarines entire crew of 50 men and gave Natal sole credit for the sinking.

Disposal
The United Kingdom returned Ascension to the U.S. Navy on 31 May 1946. She was sold to the Hudson Valley Shipwrecking Corporation of Newburgh, New York, for scrapping on 16 October 1947.

References

Notes

Bibliography
 
 Navsource Online: Frigate Photo Archive HMS Ascension (K 502) ex-Hargood ex-PF-74 ex-PG-182

External links 
 Photo archive of HMS Ascension

1943 ships
Ships built in Providence, Rhode Island
Tacoma-class frigates
Colony-class frigates
World War II frigates and destroyer escorts of the United States
World War II frigates of the United Kingdom
Royal Navy ship names